Eduard Yuriyovych Ismailov (born 8 March 1990) is a Ukrainian football defender.

Club history
Eduard Ismailov began his football career in Shakhtar Youth in Donetsk. He signed with FC Kremin Kremenchuk during 2009 summer transfer window.

International career

Ukraine youth
Eduard Ismailov made his Ukraine Under-16s debut on 21 August 2005 in a match against Belarus Under-17.

Career statistics

International career statistics

Honours

International
 Victor Bannikov tournament – 2006

References

External links
  Profile – Official Kremin site
  FC Kremin Kremenchuk Squad on the PFL website
 
 

1990 births
Living people
Sportspeople from Makiivka
Ukrainian footballers
Association football defenders
FC Olimpik Donetsk players
FC Kremin Kremenchuk players
FC Ararat Yerevan players
FC Zhemchuzhyna Yalta players
Ukrainian Second League players
Armenian Premier League players
Ukrainian expatriate footballers
Expatriate footballers in Armenia
Ukrainian expatriate sportspeople in Armenia